Duvvada railway station (station code:DVD) located in the Indian state of Andhra Pradesh, serves Duvvada, the southern outskirts of Visakhapatnam. It lies on the Howrah–Chennai main line.

History 
Between 1893 and 1896,  of the East Coast State Railway was opened for traffic. In 1898–99, Bengal Nagpur Railway was linked to the lines in southern India.

Visakhapatnam Steel Plant was established in the 1980s and the first coke oven battery was commissioned in 1989.

Development 
With the expansion of Visakhapatnam city, particularly with the setting up of Visakhapatnam Steel Plant, large groups of people started living away from the main city. People inhabiting neighbourhoods such as Aganampudi, Lankelapalem, Paravada, NTPC township, Pharma City and Ukkunagaram needed a large railway station nearer to their homes. Duvvada railway station serves the population in the southern outskirts of Visakhapatnam.

The nearest airport is Visakhapatnam Airport/VTZ which is 8 km from Duvvada railway station. Lifts are under construction at the platforms

Passenger movement 
Duvvada railway station serves about 108,000 passengers on a daily basis. Many trains always rush like Jhanmabhoomi express, Ratnachal express which are inter city service to other big cities like Secunderabad and Vijayawada.

Gallery

See also 
Duvvada
Visakhapatnam railway station
Waltair railway division
Godavari Express
Visakhapatnam Steel Plant

References

External links 
Trains at Duvvada

Railway stations in Visakhapatnam
Railway stations in Waltair railway division